The Fullerton Police Department of Fullerton, California, was established in 1904 when the city incorporated. The Fullerton Police Department currently employs 153 sworn officers and 78 civilian employees. It has a budget of about $35 million. The current chief is David Hendricks. The department has a Uniform Division, a Service Division and a Detective Division all commanded by officers in the rank of captain.

History

In April 2003, press reports indicated that two unnamed Fullerton police officers were suspended without pay for 60 hours while two more senior supervisors were suspended for 12.5 hours. The officers had been called to an address because of a possible suicide of a woman. One officer squatted next to the unconscious victim, passed wind and remarked, "This ought to wake her up." The second officer climbed into bed with the woman and pretended to lick her.

On the night of March 17, 2010, a number of Fullerton police personnel arrested an unnamed college student. The student filed a complaint that the police threatened him, broke his fingers and tortured him before stealing his iPod and $140. An internal investigation by the department confirmed that Officer Cary Tong had in fact violated department policy and broke the man's finger.

On June 1, 2010, Fullerton police conducted a lineup of assault suspects on a local street. The victim sat in a police car about 25 feet from the three men and identified the one she thought had attacked her. The police then arrested Emmanuel Martinez instead of the man she indicated. Martinez was held in jail for five months until the matter was sorted out.

In the same month, Officer Kenton Hampton objected to Edward Quinonez observing him conduct a traffic stop. He arrested Quinonez claiming he was intoxicated. In the course of the arrest, Quinonez was injured in the head. hospital reports and taped evidence showed he was not intoxicated. In July 2013, the city agreed to pay the man $25,000 to settle the matter. Officer Hampton was present at the death of Kelly Thomas in July, but was not charged.

On the night of October 20, 2010, Fullerton police officers burst into the house of Robyn Nordell without warning. They had entered the wrong house while looking for someone. The four officers did not report the mistake to the police department for five days. The matter was settled out of court. In October of the next year, the police chief publicly apologized.

In June 2011, press reports indicated that a Fullerton police officer, Kelly Janeth Mejia had been arrested at Miami International Airport after stealing an iPad at a security checkpoint. The officer was placed on paid leave by the department. She was fired in October, although the department would not make a public statement as to why she was discharged. She admitted her guilt in court in February 2012 and was sentenced to pay $100 in court costs, a $250 charitable donation and a requirement to attend a "theft class."
In July 2011, Fullerton police officer Todd Alan Major pleaded guilty to two charges involving embezzlement and theft to fuel his drug habit.  He was sentenced to six months in jail.

In August 2011, Officer Alber Rincon  was the subject of a federal lawsuit by two women claiming the officer sexually attacked them in the back seat of his police car. On July 9, the department informed the officer they intended to fire him. At this point, he was no longer to allowed to wear his badge. The city later moved settle the case. U.S. District Judge Andrew J. Guilford wrote that "Requiring Rincon to attend 'pat-down' training is weak sauce that does nothing to hide the unpleasant taste of complicity...At the end of the day, the City put Rincon back onto the streets to continue arresting women despite a pattern of sexual harassment allegations."

In January 2012, press reports indicated the Fullerton Police Department was the subject of a lawsuit concerning tow trucks in the city. The suit claimed that officers systematically harassed and intimidated tow truck drivers from companies not preferred by the department.

In March 2012, press reports indicated a Fullerton police corporal was charged with destroying his digital audio recorder  after the apparent jailhouse suicide of a person he had arrested. Corporal Vincent Thomas Mater  detained Dean Francis Gochenour for driving under the influence and took him to the Fullerton jail. Two hours later Gochenour was found hanging dead in his holding cell. When it was found Mater's recording device had been damaged, he was placed on paid leave and later fired. In November 2012, Mater pleaded guilty to misdemeanor counts of destruction of property and vandalism and was sentenced to probation.

Kelly Thomas

On the night of July 5, 2011, Fullerton police responded to reports of a man trying to break into cars. They encountered Kelly Thomas, 37, a local mentally ill transient. Thomas was an unarmed local homeless man who was beaten severely by six officers and stunned six times with a taser. Thomas was taken to a hospital, and put on life support. Later, the life support was removed; Thomas died five days later. After video of the incident and photos of Thomas in the hospital were released, five of the officers involved were placed on paid administrative leave. One other officer was already on administrative leave. The Fullerton Police Department refused to release their names at the time. The F.B.I. began an investigation. In early August, the city offered the Thomas family $900,000 to settle the matter. The family refused.

In mid-August, Orange County District Attorney Tony Rackauckas said he saw nothing in the video that pointed to an attempt by the officers to kill Thomas. At about the same time, the Thomas family launched a lawsuit that could potentially cost Fullerton millions of dollars. Local activists began a campaign to recall the mayor and city council. On August 9, the police chief stepped down, citing health concerns. Taking over from the suddenly ill police chief, acting chief Kevin Hamilton told the press that the surveillance tape from the scene (which had yet to be released by the authorities) showed "there was certainly a significant amount of struggle between Mr. Thomas and the officers." The Orange County Register reported that Thomas was ordered to sit on a curb and did so, but he failed to keep his hands on his knees as ordered. The police then reached for their batons. The Los Angeles Times reported Officer Ramos began the confrontation, putting on latex gloves and screaming, "See my fists? They are getting ready to f--- you up."

On September 6, in order to pressure the district attorney to bring charges, the family's lawyer went on local newscasts with graphic images showing the damage done Thomas by the beating.

On September 22, 2011, press reports indicated District Attorney Rackauckas changed his mind and charged Officer Manuel Ramos and Corporal Jay Cicinelli  with the killing. Ramos, 37 years old, who has served with the department for ten years, was jailed in lieu of a million dollar bond. Cicinelli, aged 39 and with a dozen years of service was released on  $25,000 bail. Cicinelli was placed on unpaid administrative leave by the Fullerton Police Department, but continued to receive his disability payments from the Los Angeles Police Department for a 1996 shooting that cost him his left eye.

The other four officers at the scene, Officer Joseph Wolfe, Officer Kenton Hampton, Sergeant Kevin Craig and Corporal James Blatney were not charged due to lack of evidence according to a statement by the District Attorney's office. Wolfe was later indicted by a grand jury in late September 2012.

In mid-January 2014, Corporal Jay Cicinelli and Officer Manuel Ramos were acquitted of all charges.

Chiefs

Sellers began paid medical leave August 2011 and retired in February 2012. Kevin Hamilton was named acting chief in his place.

Fallen officers
Since the establishment of the Fullerton Police Department, two officers have died in the line of duty.

See also

List of law enforcement agencies in California

References

External links

Government of Fullerton, California
Emergency services in Orange County, California
Municipal police departments of California
1904 establishments in California